Mudzi District is a district of Mashonaland East Province, Zimbabwe, in southern Africa. As of the 2012 census, the district had a population of 133,252, this is down from the 135,378 of the 2002 census and reflects emigration due to the poverty of the district. It has a single main road, A2, that runs from the town of Mutoko in Mutoko District in the southwest through the district, past the villages of Chifamba, Mudzi, Chingwena, Masarakufa, Nyamuwanga, the town of Kotwa, and the village of Muzezuru to the town of Nyamapanda before entering Mozambique to the northeast.

As of the 2008 delimitation, Mudzi District had seventeen administrative wards formed into three parliamentary constituencies, and one designated growth centre at Kotwa. As of 2008 the Mudzi West constituency covered the Shanga, Suswe, Mudzi, Musarakufa and Chiunye areas; the Mudzi South constituency covered Katsande, Nyamatawa, Chikwizo, Gozi and Makana areas; and the Mudzi North constituency covered the Nyamurapa, 
Kondo, Dendera, Kotwa, and Goromonzi areas and the border town of Nyamapanda.

Rivers in Mudzi District include the Mudzi and Rwenya.

Notes

External links
 

Districts of Mashonaland East Province